Redbank Plains State High School is a Secondary school located in Redbank Plains, Queensland, Australia.

History
Redbank Plains State High began operations in January 1987 with a staff of 20 teachers under the leadership of Principal Bernadette O’Rourke. Twelve classes of Year 8 students (380) began the year.

In 2008, the school won The Queensland University of Technology Showcase Award for Excellence in Leadership for its work in supporting pregnant and parenting students.

On 10 July 2012, the school was the venue for a community cabinet meeting which was attended by the Prime Minister, Julia Gillard, Cabinet ministers and roughly 400 community members.

On 15 November 2021, the school was the venue for a COVID-19 vaccine rollout press conference Premier, Annastacia Palaszczuk, Cabinet minister.

Extra-curricular activities
Redbank Plains State High School offers a range of activities (Sporting, Cultural, Arts, and Other) that provide opportunities for students to participate, learn, develop and excel.
Signature Sports Program
Soccer, Rugby League, Basketball and Volleyball
Instrumental Music Program 
Dance Troupe
Drama Troupe
Choir

See also
Education in Australia
Lists of schools in Queensland

References

External links
 Redbank Plains State High School

Public high schools in Queensland
Schools in Ipswich, Queensland
Educational institutions established in 1987
1987 establishments in Australia